Jeanne Daman (1918-1986) is one of the Righteous Among the Nations.

Biography 
She helped rescue two thousand Jewish children from the Nazis by taking them to shelters. After the war she helped to find the children so they could be brought back to their families, and helped care for children who had survived the concentration camps.  Daman also took Jewish women to be maids in Belgian households, giving them false identity papers and ration cards, and attempting to keep them informed where their children were hiding. 

She also helped find collaborators and coordinate the timing so that they could be killed. After this she took on a new identity and worked as a social worker with Winter Help, a German welfare organization. Near the end of World War II she transported arms to Mouvement Royal Belge, and she also worked as an intelligence agent in the Brussels corps of the Belgian Partisans Army.

In 1946 she immigrated to the United States, where she fundraised for Israel through the United Jewish Appeal. In 1971 Yad Vashem recognized her as Righteous Among the Nations. In 1972 she was awarded the Medal of the Righteous People on behalf of Yad Vashem. In 1980 she was awarded the ‘Entr’aide’ medal from the Belgian Jewish Committee 1940-45, under the patronage of the King of Belgium.

Her life/accomplishments 
Jeanne Daman was a twenty year-old school teacher in Belgium at the time of the outbreak of the second world war. Fela Perelman, who organized rescue efforts for Jewish children at the time, asked Ms. Daman if she would be willing to teach at a private Jewish kindergarten in Brussels, since the Jewish children were gradually denied the right to attend public schools. Daman accepted the offer and began serving as Nos Petits’ (the school in Brussels) mistress. She accepted the offer straightaway in hopes of preventing the brutal treatment and discrimination against the Jewish community that had seemingly begun taking place. She started to actively take part in the rescue of the Jewish children.

When she began teaching at the Nos Petits, she witnessed the mass arrest of the Jews, as well as the inhuman treatment they were receiving. Needless to say, this changed her life; she discovered a new purpose. Each day, she found more and more children to be absent; they were either rounded up along with their families or were placed into orphan homes. The parents of the children often sought help from her and school, but nothing could override the Nazi forces. Due to the monstrosities taking place, the Jewish school had to be closed in order to prevent further identification of the Jewish children by the Nazis. However, Daman's efforts to free the children did not end there.

She began assisting the Jewish orphans by finding safe places for them to hide, and did not lose touch with them. Often she would smuggle the children herself to the houses of the Belgian families willing to hide the Jews during the war, thus putting her own life at risk. Daman saved approximately 2,000 children who were in danger of being deported, not to mention the many adults she rescued as well. For instance, Daman arranged for a network of women to work as housemaids in houses all across Belgium. She did so by providing them with false identity papers and ration cards. By the end of the war, she was involved in several resistance movements.

Jeanne Daman continued working to reunite the hidden Jewish children and orphans with their families. According to Daman, she saved Jews for “rational, moral and emotional reason”.

Honors 
In 1971, Yad Vashem recognized her as Righteous Among the Nations. In 1972 she was awarded the Medal of the Righteous People on behalf of Yad Vashem. In 1980 she was awarded the ‘Entr’aide’ medal from the Belgian Jewish Committee 1940-45, under the patronage of the King of Belgium.

See also
Andrée Geulen

References

Belgian Roman Catholics
Belgian Righteous Among the Nations
Belgian women
Belgian emigrants to the United States
1918 births
1986 deaths
Female anti-fascists